Coibamide A is an antiproliferative depsipeptide which was isolated from a marine Leptolyngbya cyanobacterium. Testing of coibamide A in the National Cancer Institute in vitro 60 human tumor cell line panel (NCI-60) revealed potent anti-proliferative activity and a unique selectivity profile. Similarities between coibamide A- and apratoxin A-induced changes in cell morphology, decreases in VEGFR2 expression and macroautophagy signaling in HUVECs raise the possibility that both cyanobacterial natural products share a common mechanism of action. Wild-type  mouse embryonic fibroblasts were more vulnerable to coibamide A than cells lacking autophagy-related protein 5 (Atg5) that suggest coibamide A as a compound with characteristics that may utilize autophagy for pro-death signaling.

Solid-phase total syntheses of highly methylated cyclic azacoibamide A and its O-desmethyl analog were achieved to improve pharmacokinetic properties of coibamide A.

References 

Cyanotoxins
Depsipeptides
Cyclic peptides